This article is specific to small loans, often provided in a pooled manner. For direct payments to individuals for specific projects, see Micropatronage. For financial services to the poor, see Microfinance.  For small payments, see Micropayment.

Microcredit is the extension of very small loans (microloans) to impoverished borrowers who typically lack collateral, steady employment, or a verifiable credit history. It is designed to support entrepreneurship and alleviate poverty. Many recipients are illiterate, and therefore unable to complete paperwork required to get conventional loans. As of 2009 an estimated 74 million people held microloans that totaled US$38 billion. Grameen Bank reports that repayment success rates are between 95 and 98 percent.

Microcredit is part of microfinance, which provides a wider range of financial services, especially savings accounts, to the poor. Modern microcredit is generally considered to have originated with the Grameen Bank founded in Bangladesh in 1983. Many traditional banks subsequently introduced microcredit despite initial misgivings. The United Nations declared 2005 the International Year of Microcredit. As of 2012, microcredit is widely used in developing countries and is presented as having "enormous potential as a tool for poverty alleviation." Microcredit is a tool that can be helpful to possibly reduce feminization of poverty in developing countries.

Some argue that microcredit has not had a positive impact on gender relationships, does not alleviate poverty, has led many borrowers into a debt trap and constitutes a "privatization of welfare".
The first randomized evaluation of microcredit, conducted by Abhijit Banerjee and others, showed mixed results: there was no effect on household expenditure, gender equity, education or health, but the number of new businesses increased by one third compared to a control group. Some of this increase in the number of businesses can be due to the phenomenon of 'informal intermediation' documented by Frithjof Arp and collaborators: Philanthropic, low-interest-rate microcredit fosters unintended entrepreneurship where some borrowers split loans they receive and on-lend to less-entrepreneurial borrowers.

History
Ideas relating to microcredit can be found at various times in modern history. Jonathan Swift inspired the Irish Loan Funds of the 18th and 19th centuries. John Wesley began a microcredit scheme in 1746. His journal on 17/1/1748 records:I made a public collection toward a lending stock for the poor. Our rule is, to lend only twenty shillings at once, which is repaid weekly within three months. I began this about a year and a half ago: thirty pounds sixteen shillings were then collected; and out of this, no less than two hundred and fifty-five persons have been relieved in eighteen months.In the mid-19th century, Individualist anarchist Lysander Spooner wrote about the benefits of numerous small loans for entrepreneurial activities to the poor as a way to alleviate poverty. At about the same time, but independently to Spooner, Friedrich Wilhelm Raiffeisen founded the first cooperative lending banks to support farmers in rural Germany.

Comilla model

In the 1950s, Akhtar Hameed Khan began distributing group-oriented credit in East Pakistan. Khan used the Comilla Model, in which credit is distributed through community-based initiatives. The project failed due to the over-involvement of the Pakistani government, and the hierarchies created within communities as certain members began to exert more control over loans than others.

Modern microcredit

The origins of microcredit in its current practical incarnation can be linked to several organizations founded in Bangladesh, especially the Grameen Bank. The Grameen Bank, which is generally considered the first modern microcredit institution, was founded in 1983 by Muhammad Yunus. Yunus began the project in a small town called Jobra, using his own money to deliver small loans at low-interest rates to the rural poor. Grameen Bank was followed by organizations such as BRAC in 1972 and ASA in 1978.  Microcredit reached Latin America with the establishment in Bolivia in 1986 of PRODEM, a bank that later transformed into the for-profit BancoSol. In Chile, BancoEstado Microempresas is the primary microcredit institution. Microcredit quickly became a popular tool for economic development, with hundreds of institutions emerging throughout the third world. Though the Grameen Bank was formed initially as a non-profit organization dependent upon government subsidies, it later became a corporate entity and was renamed Grameen II in 2002. Yunus was awarded the Nobel Peace Prize in 2006 for his work providing microcredit services to the poor.

Principles

Economic principles
Microcredit organizations were initially created as alternatives to the "loan sharks" known to take advantage of clients. Indeed, many microlenders began as non-profit organizations and operated with government funds or private subsidies. By the 1980s, however, the "financial systems approach", influenced by neoliberalism and propagated by the Harvard Institute for International Development, became the dominant ideology among microcredit organizations. The neoliberal model of microcredit can also be referred to as the institutionist model, which promotes applying market solutions as a viable way to address social problems. The commercialization of microcredit officially began in 1984 with the formation of Unit Desa (BRI-UD) within the Bank Rakyat Indonesia. Unit Desa offered 'kupedes' microloans based on market interest rates.

Yunus has sharply criticized the shift in microcredit organizations from the Grameen Bank model as a non-profit bank to for-profit institutions:I never dreamed that one day microcredit would give rise to its own breed of loan sharks ... There are always people eager to take advantage of the vulnerable.  But credit programs that seek to profit from the suffering of the poor should not be described as "microcredit," and investors who own such programs should not be allowed to benefit from the trust and respect that microcredit banks have rightly earned.Many microcredit organizations now function as independent banks. This has led to their charging higher interest rates on loans and placing more emphasis on savings programs. Notably, Unit Desa has charged in excess of 20 percent on small business loans. The application of neoliberal economics to microcredit has generated much debate among scholars and development practitioners, with some claiming that microcredit bank directors, such as Muhammad Yunus, apply the practices of loan sharks for their personal enrichment. Indeed, the academic debate foreshadowed a Wall-street style scandal involving the Mexican microcredit organization Compartamos.

Even so, the numbers indicate that ethical microlending and investor profit can go hand-in-hand. In the 1990s a rural finance minister in Indonesia showed how Unit Desa could lower its rates by about 8% while still bringing attractive returns to investors.

Group lending

Though lending to groups has long been a key part of microcredit, microcredit initially began with the principle of lending to individuals.  Despite the use of solidarity circles in 1970s Jobra, Grameen Bank and other early microcredit institutions initially focused on individual lending.  (A solidarity circle is a group of borrowers that provide mutual encouragement, information, and assistance in times of need, though loans remain the responsibility of individuals.)
Indeed, Muhammad Yunus propagated the notion that every person has the potential to become an entrepreneur. Yunus saw poverty eradication as being in the hands of the individual. Because of this, he promoted private ownership, and consequently, neoliberalism. The use of group-lending was motivated by economics of scale, as the costs associated with monitoring loans and enforcing repayment are significantly lower when credit is distributed to groups rather than individuals.  Many times the loan to one participant in group-lending depends upon the successful repayment from another member, thus transferring repayment responsibility off of microcredit institutions to loan recipients.

Lending to women
Lending to women has become an important principle in microcredit, with banks and NGOs such as BancoSol, WWB, and Pro Mujer catering to women exclusively. Pro Mujer also implemented a new strategy to combine microcredits with health-care services, since the health of their clients is crucial to the success of microcredits. Though Grameen Bank initially tried to lend to both men and women at equal rates, women presently make up ninety-five percent of the bank's clients. Women continue to make up seventy-five percent of all microcredit recipients worldwide. Exclusive lending to women began in the 1980s when Grameen Bank found that women have higher repayment rates, and tend to accept smaller loans than men.

Examples

Bangladesh

Grameen Bank in Bangladesh is the oldest and probably best-known microfinance institution in the world. Grameen Bank launched their US operations in New York in April 2008. Bank of America has announced plans to award more than $3.7 million in grants to nonprofits to use in backing microloan programs. The Accion U.S. Network, the US subsidiary of the better-known Accion International, has provided over $450 million in microloans since 1991, with an over 90% repayment rate. One research study of the Grameen model shows that poorer individuals are safer borrowers because they place more value on the relationship with the bank. Even so, efforts to replicate Grameen-style solidarity lending in developed countries have generally not succeeded. For example, the Calmeadow Foundation tested an analogous peer-lending model in three locations in Canada during the 1990s. It concluded that a variety of factors—including difficulties in reaching the target market, the high risk profile of clients, their general distaste for the joint liability requirement, and high overhead costs—made solidarity lending unviable without subsidies. Microcredits have also been introduced in Israel, Russia, Ukraine and other nations where micro-loans help small business entrepreneurs overcome cultural barriers in the mainstream business society. The Israel Free Loan Association (IFLA) has lent more than $100 million in the past two decades to Israeli citizens of all backgrounds.

India 
In India, the National Bank for Agriculture and Rural Development (NABARD) finances more than 500 banks that on-lend funds to self-help groups (SHGs). SHGs comprise twenty or fewer members, of whom the majority are women from the poorest castes and tribes. Members save small amounts of money, as little as a few rupees a month in a group fund. Members may borrow from the group fund for a variety of purposes ranging from household emergencies to school fees. As SHGs prove capable of managing their funds well, they may borrow from a local bank to invest in small business or farm activities. Banks typically lend up to four rupees for every rupee in the group fund. In Asia borrowers generally pay interest rates that range from 30% to 70% without commission and fees. Nearly 1.4 million SHGs comprising approximately 20 million women now borrow from banks, which makes the Indian SHG-Bank Linkage model the largest microfinance program in the world. Similar programs are evolving in Africa and Southeast Asia with the assistance of organizations like IFAD, Opportunity International, Catholic Relief Services, Compassion International, CARE, APMAS, Oxfam, Tearfund and World Vision.

United States 
In the United States, microcredit has generally been defined as loans of less than $50,000 to people—mostly entrepreneurs—who cannot, for various reasons, borrow from a bank. Most nonprofit microlenders include services like financial literacy training and business plan consultations, which contribute to the expense of providing such loans but also, those groups say, to the success of their borrowers. One such organization in the United States, the Accion U.S. Network is a nonprofit microfinance organization headquartered in New York, New York. It is the largest and only nationwide nonprofit microfinance network in the US. The Accion U.S. Network is part of Accion International, a US-based nonprofit organization operating globally, with the mission of giving people the financial tools they need to create or grow healthy businesses. The domestic Accion programs started in Brooklyn, New York, and grew from there to become the first nationwide network microlender. US microcredit programs have helped many poor but ambitious borrowers to improve their lot. The Aspen Institute's study of 405 microentrepreneurs indicates that more than half of the loan recipients escaped poverty within five years. On average, their household assets grew by nearly $16,000 during that period; the group's reliance on public assistance dropped by more than 60%. Several corporate sponsors including Citi Foundation and Capital One launched Grameen America in New York. Since then the financial outfit—not bank—has been serving the poor, mainly women, throughout four of the city's five boroughs (Bronx, Brooklyn, Manhattan, and Queens) as well as Omaha, Nebraska and Indianapolis, Indiana. In four years, Grameen America has facilitated loans to over 9,000 borrowers valued over $35 million. It has had, as Grameen CEO Stephen Vogel notes, "a 99 percent repayment rate".

Peer-to-peer lending over the Web
The principles of microcredit have also been applied in attempting to address several non-poverty-related issues.  Among these, multiple Internet-based organizations have developed platforms that facilitate a modified form of peer-to-peer lending where a loan is not made in the form of a single, direct loan, but as the aggregation of a number of smaller loans—often at a negligible interest rate.

Examples of platforms that connect lenders to micro-entrepreneurs via Internet are Kiva, Zidisha, and the Microloan Foundation. Another internet-based microlender, United Prosperity, uses a variation on the usual microlending model; with United Prosperity the micro-lender provides a guarantee to a local bank which then lends back double that amount to the micro-entrepreneur. United Prosperity claims this provides both greater leverage and allows the micro-entrepreneur to develop a credit history with their local bank for future loans. In 2009, the US-based nonprofit Zidisha became the first peer-to-peer microlending platform to link lenders and borrowers directly across international borders without local intermediaries. From 2008 through 2014, Vittana allowed peer-to-peer lending for student loans in developing countries.

Impact of microcredit

The impact of microcredit is a subject of some controversy. Proponents state that it reduces poverty through higher employment and higher incomes. This is expected to lead to improved nutrition and improved education of the borrowers' children. Some argue that microcredit empowers women. In the US, UK and Canada, it is argued that microcredit helps recipients to graduate from welfare programs.

Critics say that microcredit, if not carefully directed, may not increased incomes, and may drive poor households into a debt trap. They add that the money from loans may be used for durable consumer goods or consumption instead of being used for productive investments, that it may fail to empower women, and that it may not improved health or education.

The available evidence indicates that in many cases microcredit has facilitated the creation and the growth of businesses. It has often generated self-employment, but it has not necessarily increased incomes after interest payments. In some cases it has driven borrowers into debt traps. Some studies suggest that microcredit has not generally empowered women. Microcredit has achieved much less than what its proponents said it would achieve, but its negative impacts have not been as drastic as some critics have argued. Microcredit is just one factor influencing the success of a small businesses, whose success is influenced to a much larger extent by how much an economy or a particular market grows.

Unintended consequences of microfinance include informal intermediation: some entrepreneurial borrowers may become informal intermediaries between microfinance initiatives and poorer micro-entrepreneurs. Those who more easily qualify for microfinance may split loans into smaller credit to even poorer borrowers. Informal intermediation ranges from casual intermediaries at the good or benign end of the spectrum to loan sharks at the professional and sometimes criminal end of the spectrum.

Improvement

Many scholars and practitioners suggest an integrated package of services ("a credit-plus" approach) rather than just providing credits. When access to credit is combined with savings facilities, non-productive loan facilities, insurance, enterprise development (production-oriented and management training, marketing support) and welfare-related services (literacy and health services, gender and social awareness training), the adverse effects discussed above can be diminished. Some argue that more experienced entrepreneurs who are getting loans should be qualified for bigger loans to ensure the success of the program.

One of the principal challenges of microcredit is providing small loans at an affordable cost.  The global average interest and fee rate is estimated at 37%, with rates reaching as high as 70% in some markets. The reason for the high interest rates is not primarily cost of capital.  Indeed, the local microfinance organizations that receive zero-interest loan capital from the online microlending platform Kiva charge average interest and fee rates of 35.21%.  Rather, the principal reason for the high cost of microcredit loans is the high transaction cost of traditional microfinance operations relative to loan size.  Microcredit practitioners have long argued that such high interest rates are simply unavoidable.  The result is that the traditional approach to microcredit has made only limited progress in resolving the problem it purports to address: that the world's poorest people pay the world's highest cost for small business growth capital.  The high costs of traditional microcredit loans limit their effectiveness as a poverty-fighting tool. Borrowers who do not manage to earn a rate of return at least equal to the interest rate may actually end up poorer as a result of accepting the loans. According to a recent survey of microfinance borrowers in Ghana published by the Center for Financial Inclusion, more than one-third of borrowers surveyed reported struggling to repay their loans. In recent years, microcredit providers have shifted their focus from the objective of increasing the volume of lending capital available, to address the challenge of providing microfinance loans more affordably.  Analyst David Roodman contends that in mature markets, the average interest and fee rates charged by microfinance institutions tend to fall over time.

Professor Dean Karlan from Yale University advocates also giving the poor access to savings accounts.

See also
 Cooperative banking
 Count Me In (charity)
 Crowdfunding
 Crowd sourcing
 Flat rate (finance)
 Microcredit for water supply and sanitation
 Microgrant
 M-Pesa
 Project Enterprise
 Solidarity lending
 The Women's Development Bank
 Oikocredit

References

Further reading
 Adams, Dale, Doug Graham and J.D. Von Pischke (eds.).  Undermining Rural Development with Cheap Credit.  Westview Press, Boulder, Colorado, 1984.
Bateman, Milford. 'Why Doesn't Microfinance Work? The Destructive Rise of Local Neoliberalism'. Zed Books, London, 2010.
Drake, Deborah, and Elizabeth Rhyne (eds.).  The Commercialization of Microfinance:  Balancing Business and Development.  Kumarian Press, 2002.
Rhyne, Elizabeth.  Mainstreaming Microfinance:  How Lending to the Poor Began, Grew and Came of Age in Bolivia.  Kumarian Press, 2001.
Fuglesang, Andreas and Dale Chandler. Participation as Process – Process as Growth – What We can Learn from the Grameen Bank.  Grameen Trust, Dhaka, 1993.
Gibbons, David.  The Grameen Reader.  Grameen Bank, Dhaka, 1992.
Harper, Malcolm and Shailendra Vyakarnam.  Rural Enterprise:  Case Studies from Developing Countries. ITDG Publishing, 1988.
Hulme, David and Paul Mosley.  Finance Against Poverty.  Routledge, London, 1996.
Johnson, Susan and Ben Rogaly.  Microfinance and Poverty Reduction.  Oxfam, Oxford UK, 1997.
Kadaras, James & Elizabeth Rhyne.  Characteristics of equity investment in microfinance. Accion International, 2004.
Khandker, Shahidur R. Fighting Poverty with Microcredit. Bangladesh edition, The University Press Ltd, Dhaka, 1999.
Ledgerwood, Joanna.  Microfinance Handbook.  Washington, D.C., World Bank, 1998.
Rutherford, Stuart.  ASA:  The Biography of an NGO, Empowerment and Credit in Rural Bangladesh.  ASA, Dhaka, 1995.
Small Enterprise Development. Intermediate Technology Publications, London.
Todd, Helen Women at the Center:  Grameen Borrowers After One Decade. University Press Ltd, Dhaka, 1996.
Wood, Geoff D. & I. Sharif (eds.).  Who Needs Credit?  Poverty and Finance in Bangladesh.  University Press Ltd., Dhaka, 1997.
 Yunus Muhammad, Moingeon Bertrand & Laurence Lehmann-Ortega, "Building Social Business Models: Lessons from the Grameen Experience", April-June, vol 43, n° 2-3, Long Range Planning, 2010, p. 308-325"
Tonelli M. and C. Dalglish, 2012. "Micro-Credit is Necessary but Not Sufficient for Entrepreneurs in Desperate Poverty", FSR Forum, Vo.14, Issue 4 (p. 16-21). ISSN 1389-0913
Yunus, Muhammad.  Banker to the Poor:  Micro-Lending and the Battle Against World Poverty.  Public Affairs, 2003.
Padmanabahn, K.P., Rural Credit, Intermediate Tech. Publ. Ltd., London 1988.
Germidis D. et al.,Financial Systems and Development: what role for the formal and informal financial sectors?, OECD, Paris 1991.
Robinson, Marguerite S., The microfinance revolution, The World Bank, Washington D.C., 2001.
Mauri, Arnaldo, (1995): A new approach to institutional lending and loan administration in rural areas of LDCs, International Review of Economics, ISSN 1865-1704, Vol. 45, no. 4, pp. 707–716.

Johnson, S. 1997. Gender and Micro-finance: guidelines for best practice. Action Aid-UK.
Kabeer, N. 1998. 'Money Can't Buy Me Love'? Re-evaluating Gender, Credit and Empowerment in Rural Bangladesh. IDS Discussion Paper 363.
Mayoux, L. 1998a. Women's Empowerment and Micro-finance programmes: Approaches, Evidence and Ways Forward. The Open University Working Paper No 41.

CHESTON, S. and KUHN, L. (2002). Empowering Women through Microfinance. Pathways Out of Poverty: Innovations in Microfinance for the Poorest Families.
Harper, A. ( 1995). Providing women in Baltistan with access to loans – potential and problems. Lahore, AKRSP Pakistan.
Mutalima, I. K., 2006, Microfinance and Gender Equality: Are We Getting There?: Micro Credit Summit, Halifa, Royal Tropical Institute and Oxfam Novib.

External links
 Latest Findings from Randomized Evaluations of Microfinance Access to Finance Forum by CGAP and Its Partners No. 2, December 2011
 Building a Microfinance Institution from Scratch Institution's objective is to offer financial services on a self-sustaining yet efficient basis to microentrepreneurs.
 Journal of Microfinance, a forum for practitioners in microfinance and microenterprise development to exchange information and ideas
 Omidyar-Tufts Microfinance Fund, a partnership between Pierre Omidyar and Tufts University.
"Microfinance in the U.S." Helping ensure egalitarian access to needed financial services.
The Promise of Microfinance for Poverty Relief in the Developing World
Microcredit Regulatory Authority, MRA The central body to monitor and supervise microfinance operation of NGOs of Bangladesh
Alleviation and poverty and empowerment of the poor, BRAC Bangladesh
The European Union Project "Credit Cooperatives – Russian Federation" official web site

Microfinance
Bangladeshi inventions
Irish inventions
Pakistani inventions